Presidential elections were held in Chile on 4 September 1970. Salvador Allende of the Popular Unity alliance won a narrow plurality in a race against independent Jorge Alessandri and Christian Democrat Radomiro Tomic, before having his victory confirmed by a Congressional vote after the Christian Democrats voted in favour of his candidacy.

Both the United States and the Soviet Union poured money into this election through their intelligence agencies and other sources, with the former attempting to sabotage Allende, and the latter supporting his campaign. Ambassador Edward Korry would play a major role in anti-Allende campaigns during the election.

Eduardo Frei Montalva and his Christian Democratic Party would later unite with Allende's opponents to form a congressional majority in an attempt to declare his presidency illegal in August 1973, catalyzing the military coup a few weeks later.

Electoral system
The election was held using the absolute majority system, under which a candidate had to receive over 50% of the popular vote to be elected. If no candidate received over 50% of the vote, both houses of the National Congress would come together to vote on the two candidates that received the most votes.

Campaign

Salvador Allende
Allende was a self-described Marxist and lifetime member of the Chilean Socialist Party. He had a career in politics that included being a senator and 3 consecutive bids for the presidency prior to the 1970 election cycle. In 1970 he ran for the Popular Unity coalition, a political alliance consisting of the leftists of Chile including the Chilean Communist Party and Chilean Socialist Party. His platform included 40 promises that would benefit the lower class, including ending inflation, greatly reducing the cost of medicine, and the adjustment of public housing rent. The remaining promises also fell in line with the socialist ideology of Allende and the Popular Unity coalition.

Radomiro Tomic
Radomiro Tomic was a major figure in the Christian Democratic Party and was ambassador to Washington under President Eduardo Frei. As a longtime friend of Frei, he was appointed as an ambassador to put him on the path to candidacy for the party in 1970. He was ideologically to the left of President Frei. He spent a large portion of his political career campaigning for a coalition between Christian Democrats and Leftists, despite most of both groups consistently not supporting his idea. He was known for being an egotistical, but nonetheless very charismatic speaker. His campaign benefited from the prestige of being ambassador to Washington, as well as his friendship with President Frei. However, it was hurt by his continued insistence on forming a coalition, as well as directly criticizing and attacking the Christian Democratic Party’s own bills and the Frei administration’s reforms. Voters often turned away from him due to his confusing campaign platform coming off as a more convoluted way of implementing socialism compared to instead electing Marxist Allende.

Jorge Alessandri
Prior to running in the 1970 election, Jorge Alessandri was a career politician and served as the 27th President of Chile from 1958 to 1964, until the constitution barred him from succeeding himself. He was the prior administration to Christian Democrat Eduardo Frei. His conservative independent platform represented voters who were concerned by the reforms Frei had implemented over the course of his administration. Due to his prestige of formerly being the President of Chile, his campaign started out very strong. However, over time he lost support for a variety of reasons.

One major factor was his age and health. At the time of the 1970 election, Alessandri was 74 years old and had experienced a variety of health issues, mental and physical, including on national TV. According to Sergio Riesenberg, Alessandri's appearance on TV backfired and cost him the election. On the TV program Tres Bandas hosted by Gonzalo Bertrán there were two separate shots that showed him in bad light. In the first Alessandri said that he would be determined and that his "hands would not shake", subsequently the camera focused his hands that were actually shaking. In the second frame he was seen next to a stove warming his legs with a blanket despite it being spring. According to Riesenberg all this gave the public the impression of a man who was not longer of "an adequate age to become president".

Another major factor was his campaign being staffed mostly by amateurs, which led to the wasting of resources, creating of ineffective propaganda, issues mobilizing supporters, and trouble spreading a positive message to voters. US intelligence reports stated that supporters believed that Alessandri could win using his name alone and spent most of the campaign attacking Frei's reforms instead of directly promoting Alessandri. In the end, he finished second, meaning that the congressional vote was between him and Allende.

International involvement

Intelligence agencies
Both the Central Intelligence Agency (CIA) and the KGB spent significant amounts of money to influence the outcome of the election.

The CIA did not provide direct assistance to any candidate, as they had during the 1964 elections, but rather focused on anti-Allende propaganda, and the 40 Committee approved $435,000 for that purpose. In fact that represented only about half the money spent by the CIA to influence the election; the Church Committee put the total amount at between $800,000 and $1 million. The money approved by the 40 Committee was used in a "scare campaign" of posters and pamphlets linking an Allende victory with the violence and repression associated with the Soviet Union. Editorials and news stories reinforcing this message were also written with CIA guidance, especially in the newspaper El Mercurio, and disseminated throughout the national media. The goal was to contribute to and exploit the political polarization and financial panic of the period. Besides propaganda, the CIA also funded an attempt to splinter the Radical Party away from the Popular Unity coalition. This CIA campaign was very inefficient. CIA director Richard Helms complained that he was ordered by the White House to "beat somebody with nobody". Although the 40 Committee had decided not to support any candidate directly, the CIA did help US companies in funding candidates. In total, US businesses spend about $700,000; half of that sum was provided by the International Telephone & Telegraph Corporation (ITT).

KGB money was more precisely targeted. Allende made a personal request for Soviet money through his personal contact, KGB officer Svyatoslav Kuznetsov, who  urgently came to Chile from Mexico City to help Allende. The original allocation of money for these elections through the KGB was $400,000, and an additional personal subsidy of $50,000 directly to Allende. It is believed that help from KGB was a decisive factor, because Allende won by a narrow margin of 39,000 votes of a total of the 3 million cast. After the elections, the KGB director Yuri Andropov obtained permission for additional money and other resources from the Central Committee of the CPSU to ensure Allende victory in Congress. In his request on 24 October, he stated that KGB "will carry out measures designed to promote the consolidation of Allende's victory and his election to the post of President of the country".

US president Richard Nixon was enraged by Allende's victory and the failure of the CIA's covert actions against him.

US ambassador

Edward M. Korry was the United States ambassador to Chile from 1967 to 1971, during which he was very involved in Chilean politics, particularly the 1970 elections. During the elections he spent time analyzing each candidate and their campaigns, and would report back to the state department, making recommendations on how to handle involvement. On many occasions he expressed that he strongly believed that Allende was a major threat to the United States. He believed that an anti-Allende campaign was necessary to prevent the formation of a Leninist state in Chile, and even advocated the further expansion of it throughout the election. A major basis for expanding it was the trends that were occurring in the election, namely the rapid decline of Alessandri’s campaign, the continued stagnation of Tomic’s, and the growing support of Allende, much of which came from voters moving away from Alessandri and Tomic. He did not believe that the people of Chile or US private business would be able to do enough to stop Allende's election.

Korry was very actively involved in the Christian Democrats and the Frei administration, quickly developing a close relationship with Frei. At the request of Frei, he became more directly involved in Tomic's campaign, as he was becoming frustrated with Tomic's frequent criticism of the party he was running for, as well as with his increasingly leftist views. One major point of involvement was attempting to stop Tomic from continuing to advocate for an alliance with the Soviet Union. Over time, Korry would become frustrated with Tomic as well, a bad sign for US relations if Tomic had become President.

Korry was later accused of involvement in the 1973 coup due to his vocal criticism of Allende, despite not being involved, with his innocence only being acknowledged by major media outlets in 1981. He strongly opposed any military intervention in Chile, both immediately after the election, and three years later when Pinochet came to power.

Track I and track II 
The United States executive branch had two plans to prevent Allende from ascending to power if he won the vote. Track I was led by the State Department and involved manipulation of Chilean politics within the bounds of the Chilean constitution to lead to President Frei being re-elected. The CIA was not involved with it. Track II, or Project FUBELT, was a CIA operation that did not involve the State Department or Department of Defense, consisting of forming and supporting a group within the Chilean military who would stage a coup. Circumstantially, Track I was not possible, so the United States moved forward with Project FUBELT.

Results
As none of the candidates received an absolute majority in the public vote, the National Congress had to decide between the two candidates who had received the most votes, Allende and Alessandri. The precedent set on the three previous occasions this situation had arisen since 1932 was for Congress simply to choose the candidate with the highest number of votes; indeed, former President Alessandri had been elected in 1958 with 31.6% of the popular vote, defeating Allende.

In this case, however, there was an active campaign against Allende's confirmation by Congress, including an intensification of the CIA propaganda campaign to create concerns about Chile's future. During this period the CIA generated over 726 articles, broadcasts and similar items. The CIA also encouraged international economic pressure against Chile during this period. The United States also began to lay the groundwork for a military coup in this stage, authorizing the Ambassador to Chile to encourage this outcome with his contacts in the Chilean military.

In the summer prior to the election, reports stated that out of the 200 senators and deputies of congress, Allende had 82 supporters, including the 80 personnel who were members of the Communist Party, who were a major organizing force in the Popular Unity coalition. Following Allende, Tomic had 75 supporters, and Alessandri's supporters were the remaining 43 supporters out of the 200 congresspeople.

Two days before the confirmation, Army Commander-in-Chief General René Schneider, was shot resisting a kidnap attempt by a group led by General Roberto Viaux. Hospitalized, he died of his wounds three days later. Viaux's kidnapping plan had been supported by the CIA through Project FUBELT. Schneider was a known defender of the "constitutionalist" doctrine that the army's role is exclusively professional, its mission being to protect the country's sovereignty and not to interfere in politics, and had expressed his deep opposition to organizing a coup d'état in case Salvador Allende was finally chosen by the National Congress as President. Schneider's death was viewed negatively by the public, and helped citizens and military support Allende, whom the National Congress finally chose on 24 October. On 26 October, President Eduardo Frei named General Carlos Prats as commander in chief of the army in replacement of René Schneider.

Allende's presidency was eventually ratified, after he agreed to sign a "Statute of Constitutional Guarantees", promising not to undermine the constitution.

See also
History of Chile
United States intervention in Chile
Politics of Chile

References

External links
Archivos Internet Salvador Allende - A pro-Allende Spanish-language source, provides enormous day-by-day detail on the events between the election and Allende's inauguration as president 

Chile
Presidential
1970 in Chile
Presidential elections in Chile
Presidency of Salvador Allende
Chile